The Lac de Mâl is a lake in Mauritania's Brakna Region,  eastsouth-east of  Aleg. The lake is permanent and is fed mainly by the Oued Leye. It is an important habitat for various species of birds.

References

Sources 
 Map E-28-XXIX

Lakes of Mauritania